Mark Carroll (born 15 January 1972 in Knocknaheeny, Cork) is a former Irish runner that went to school in The North Monastery, who specialized in the 5000 metres. He was the 1991 European junior champion over 5,000m; 2000 European Indoor champion over 3,000m and won a bronze medal in the 1998 European Championships over 5,000m.

Carroll missed the 1996 Olympics due to injury and missed qualifying for the 5,000m final at the 2000 Olympics by one place. He finished 6th in the 2002 New York Marathon, but decided not to look to compete over that distance in the 2004 Olympics due to the heat and humidity in Athens. He has also been coaching other Irish athletes such as Gareth Turnbull since about 2005 and in 2008 was appointed US Athlete Manager for Athletics Ireland. In August, 2009 he was appointed head cross country coach at Auburn University. Currently, Carroll serves at the Director of Track and Field at Drake University.

Achievements

Personal bests
1500 metres - 3:34.91 min (2000)
One mile - 3:50.62 min (2000)
3000 metres - 7:30.36 min (1999) Irish Record
5000 metres - 13:03.93 min (1998) 
10,000 metres - 27:46.82 min (2000)
Marathon - 2:10:54 hrs (2002)

References

External links

Profile

1972 births
Living people
Auburn Tigers cross country coaches
Irish male long-distance runners
Athletes (track and field) at the 2000 Summer Olympics
Athletes (track and field) at the 2004 Summer Olympics
Olympic athletes of Ireland
Sportspeople from Cork (city)
European Athletics Championships medalists
Drake Bulldogs track and field coaches
People educated at North Monastery